Carex barbata is a Tasmanian species of sedge that was first formally named by Francis Boott in 1858, in his Illustrations of the genus Carex. A specimen collected in February 1839 by R. C. Gunn is the only known collection of this species. In 1909, it was reclassified as a variety of Carex gunniana, but Kew's Plants of the World Online maintains it as a separate species.

References

barbata
Endemic flora of Tasmania
Plants described in 1858